Goldfields South, an electoral district of the Legislative Assembly in the Australian state of New South Wales was created in 1859 and abolished in 1880.


Election results

Elections in the 1870s

1877

1875

1872

Elections in the 1860s

December 1870 by-election

June 1870 by-election

1870

1865

1863 by-election

1860

Elections in the 1850s

1859

References 

New South Wales state electoral results by district